The Antwerp Book Fair Boekenbeurs) was a large trade fair for books, held annually at the beginning of November in Antwerp Expo, Antwerp, Belgium. All Flemish and Dutch publishers, and several foreign language distributors used to present their newest books at the fair.

See also
 Flemish literature

External links

  (official website)
 

Trade fairs in Belgium
Culture in Antwerp
Economy of Belgium
Antwerp
Autumn events in Belgium